Woodford Hall was a large house in Woodford, Essex, with 50 acres of land adjacent to Epping Forest.

In 1707, Sir Richard Child sold the Hall to Christopher Crowe, who sold it to William Hunt in 1728, having obtained a private Act of Parliament.  It remained in the Hunt family until 1801, when it was sold to the politician John Maitland.

It was built or rebuilt in 1775 by the architect Thomas Leverton. In 1777, it was leased to John Goddard, a Rotterdam merchant, whose widow died there in 1814, after which Maitland moved in, dying there in 1831.

William Whitaker Maitland, his son, inherited the property, and leased it to William Cox, and in 1840, to William Morris, father of William Morris the textile designer, poet, and socialist activist, then aged 6. In 1847, his father died unexpectedly, and in 1848, the family moved nearby to the smaller Water House.

In 1869 the Woodford Hall estate was sold to British Land for redevelopment, but was used as Mrs. Gladstone's convalescent home until 1900, when it was demolished.

In 1902, the Parish Church Memorial Hall was built at the front of the site.

References

Country houses in Essex
Country houses in London
Demolished buildings and structures in England
Buildings and structures demolished in 1900